Whitewater is an unincorporated community with a U.S. Post Office in Mesa County, Colorado, United States, just south of Grand Junction.  The Whitewater Post Office has the ZIP Code 81527. It is located on the banks of the Gunnison River near the confluences with Whitewater Creek and Kannah Creek to the south.

Historic places
Near Whitewater are the following historic places:
 Bloomfield Site is a prehistoric archaeological site from 8999 BC - AD 1799, starting with the Archaic culture.  It was added to the National Register of Historic Places in 1983.  
 Land’s End Aboriginal Site, an archaeological site from the Archaic prehistoric period, is listed on the Colorado State Register of Historic Properties.
 Land's End Observatory is a historic ranger observatory, off of the Grand Mesa Scenic and Historic Byway, with a panoramic view of western Colorado and eastern Utah.  It is listed on the National Register of Historic Places.

See also 
 List of cities and towns in Colorado
 Old Spanish National Historic Trail
 List of prehistoric sites in Colorado

References 

Unincorporated communities in Mesa County, Colorado
Unincorporated communities in Colorado